This is a list of campaign settings published for role-playing games. Since role-playing games originally developed from wargames, there are many historical and alternate-history RPGs based on Earth. The settings for such games are excluded from this list, unless they include significant fictional elements.

Many RPG campaign settings are based on fictional universes from books, comics, video games, or films. Campaigns have been created for Star Wars, Lord of the Rings, Star Trek, and James Bond, for example.

Fantasy campaigns

Amber
Alfeimur - Dark fantasy, d20 System, L&A Media
Avernos - Medieval fantasy, The continent of Avernos, Rising Phoenix Games
Diablo universe (set on the World of Sanctuary)
Dying Earth
Exodus (D&D set on the world of Exodus)
Grimm
Magnamund (the world the Lone Wolf d20 rpg takes place in)
Midgard
Midgard (Alshard)
Dragon Fist
Bushido (role-playing game)
Creation is the name for the Exalted series of RPGs scenario.
Weapons of the Gods

Horror
 The Buffyverse (Buffy the Vampire Slayer/Angel)
Chill
 The Chronicles of Darkness (White Wolf Publishing house setting introduced in the 2000s)
Cthulhu Mythos
 Delta Green (1990s/2000s)
 CthulhuTech by Wildfire - H.P. Lovecraft's horror with Mecha and Anime influences
 Engel
 The Esoterrorists (contemporary occult conspiracy, using the Gumshoe System)
 The GURPS Cabal setting (contemporary monster conspiracy)
Kult a nightmare universe parallel to our own, heavily influenced by gnosticism
Little Fears where you play children haunted by horrors, supernatural or quite natural.
Night's Black Agents contemporary horror/espionage, using the Gumshoe System
Ravenloft (D&D)
Masque of the Red Death (1890s "Gothic Earth")
 Living Death
SLA Industries
 The Weird West (Deadlands)
 The World of Darkness (White Wolf Publishing house setting introduced in the 1990s)
 Unknown Armies (contemporary underground occult)
 Witchcraft
 Witch Hunter: The Invisible World
 The Yellow King (reality horror, using a modified Gumshoe System)

Science fiction

Imperium (Dark Heresy/Rogue Trader/Deathwatch Warhammer 40K)
MechWarrior
Shatterzone
Terra Incognita (role-playing game)

Superhero
Champions Universe uses Champions (role-playing game) rules.
Continuum is the name for a setting that spans three games: Adventure! (pulp-era), Aberrant (contemporary supers) and Trinity (science-fiction).
DC Universe had been licensed to the cancelled DC Heroes and DC Universe RPGs; the new DC Adventures RPG was released in late 2010.
Freedom City (M&M)
Godlike is set in World War II, and inspired a modern-day game in the same setting, Wild Talents.
GURPS International Super Teams is the house setting for GURPS Supers
Heroes Unlimited, Villains Unlimited and Aliens Unlimited use Palladium's Rule System.
Marvel Universe had been licensed to the canceled Marvel Super Heroes, Marvel Universe Roleplaying Game and Marvel Adventure Game.
META-4 (M&M)
Mutant City Blues, a near-future superhero setting using the Gumshoe System
Omlevex (Third-Party M&M)
Watchmen, by Alan Moore, was released to the DC Heroes system.
Wild Cards (uses GURPS or M&M)

Multi-genre
Castle Falkenstein (role-playing game): New Europa
Deadlands
Feng Shui (role-playing game)
Over the Edge (role-playing game)
Shadowrun
Tails of Equestria
TORG

Comedy/satire
Alpha Complex (Paranoia)
Discworld (GURPS)
Illuminati University (GURPS)

See also
Dungeons & Dragons campaign settings
List of fictional universes

References

External links 
DnD wiki campaign listings Links to many homebrew settings
RPG Gateway's campaign listings Links to many homebrew settings, with ratings and summaries
RPG Net's list of homebrew campaign settings  A lengthy list of homebrew settings available online

Campaign settings